Kameron Lee Misner (born January 8, 1998) is an American professional baseball outfielder in the Tampa Bay Rays organization.

Amateur career
Misner attended and graduated from Poplar Bluff High School in Poplar Bluff, Missouri. As a senior, he batted .422 with eight home runs, 35 RBIs, and 29 stolen bases. After his senior year, he was drafted by the Kansas City Royals in the 33rd round of the 2016 Major League Baseball draft. However, he did not sign and instead chose to attend the University of Missouri to play college baseball for the Missouri Tigers.

As a freshman at Missouri in 2017, Misner slashed .282/.360/.446 with seven home runs and 34 RBIs in 58 games. He was named a Freshman All-American by D1Baseball. That summer, he played in the New England Collegiate Baseball League where he batted .378 with eight home runs, 25 RBIs, and 14 stolen bases in 135 at-bats, earning a spot on the All-Star team.
In 2018, as a sophomore, he batted .360 with four home runs and 25 RBIs in 34 games before a foot injury forced him to miss the final 22 games of the season. Prior to the 2019 season, Misner was named a Preseason All-American by Baseball America and Perfect Game/Rawlings. In 56 games in 2019, Misner slashed .286/.440/.481 with ten home runs, 32 RBIs, and twenty stolen bases.

Professional career

Miami Marlins
Misner was considered one of the top prospects for the 2019 Major League Baseball draft. He was selected by the Miami Marlins with the 35th overall pick, and signed with them for $2.1 million. Misner made his professional debut with the Rookie-level Gulf Coast Marlins and, after eight games, was promoted to the Clinton LumberKings of the Class A Midwest League. Over 42 games between the two clubs, he batted .270/.388/.362 with two home runs and 24 RBIs. He did not play a minor league game in 2020 due to the cancellation of the minor league season caused by the COVID-19 pandemic.

Misner was assigned to the Beloit Snappers of the High-A Central to begin 2021. After slashing .244/.350/.424 with 11 home runs, 56 RBIs, and 24 stolen bases over 88 games, he was promoted to the Pensacola Blue Wahoos of the Double-A South in late August. Over 14 games with Pensacola, Misner hit .309 with one home run and seven doubles. He was selected to play in the Arizona Fall League for the Mesa Solar Sox after the season.

Tampa Bay Rays
On November 30, 2021, the Marlins traded Misner to the Tampa Bay Rays in exchange for Joey Wendle. He was assigned to the Montgomery Biscuits of the Double-A Southern League for the 2022 season. Over 117 games, he slashed .251/.384/.431 with 16 home runs, 62 RBIs, 25 doubles, and 32 stolen bases.

References

External links

Missouri Tigers bio

1998 births
Living people
People from Poplar Bluff, Missouri
Baseball players from Missouri
Baseball outfielders
Missouri Tigers baseball players
Gulf Coast Marlins players
Clinton LumberKings players
Beloit Snappers players
Pensacola Blue Wahoos players
Montgomery Biscuits players
Mesa Solar Sox players